Barforth is a civil parish in the Teesdale district of County Durham, England, near Gainford.  According to the 2001 census the parish had a population of 77. At the 2011 Census the population remained less than 100. Information is therefore maintained in the parish of Ovington.   The northern border of the parish is the River Tees.

Landmarks
The abandoned village of Old Richmond lay in Barforth, west of Gainford, and the remains include the ruins of a dovecote and of St Lawrence's chapel, as well as the still-inhabited Barforth Hall.

External links
 
 

Civil parishes in County Durham
Deserted medieval villages in County Durham